Lungs is the debut studio album by English indie rock band Florence and the Machine, released on 3 July 2009 by Island Records. After working on various projects, Florence Welch formed a band which included Robert Ackroyd, Chris Hayden, Mark Saunders, Tom Monger, and former collaborator Isabella Summers. The album features production from James Ford, Paul Epworth, Stephen Mackey, Eg White and Charlie Hugall, with additional production by band member Isabella Summers. The album has been reissued several times: an expanded version titled Between Two Lungs (2010), a digital EP subtitled The B-Sides (2011), and a Tenth Anniversary Edition (2019).

Lungs received generally positive reviews from music critics, with Welch drawing comparisons to the likes of Kate Bush and Fiona Apple. It appeared on several year-end critics' lists in late 2009. The album won the award for British Album of the Year at the Brit Awards. Commercially, Lungs reached number one in Poland and the United Kingdom, and number 14 in the US Billboard 200, selling over 3 million copies worldwide.

The album was supported by six singles, all of which were supplemented by accompanying music videos. "Kiss with a Fist" peaked at 51 in the United Kingdom while "Dog Days Are Over" and "Rabbit Heart (Raise It Up)" also charted in Australia and Belgium. Three further singles followed the release of the album, "Drumming Song", a cover of the song "You've Got the Love", and "Cosmic Love". Their cover of the Source and Candi Staton song became the group's first top-10 entry. To promote the album, Florence and the Machine embarked on the Lungs Tour between 2008 and 2011. A live album from this concert was released in 2010, titled Live at the Wiltern.

Background and recording

Prior to recording Lungs, Florence Welch had considered or attempted several different projects in the music industry, including an interest in becoming a country singer, recording folk songs she had written, and collaborating with Razorlight's frontman Johnny Borrell, but ultimately she was unsatisfied with those endeavors. Welch and Borrell wrote several songs together. In 2007, Welch fronted the hip hop-influenced group Ashok, recording an early version of "Kiss with a Fist", titled "Happy Slap", for their debut studio album, Plans.

It was not until Welch began writing and recording with childhood friend Isabella Summers at Antenna Studios in London that Welch crafted a sound she wanted to develop further. Distraught but also inspired from a recently failed relationship, Welch recorded with "enthusiasm over skills", stating, "I'm quite glad I never learned to play the guitar, because I think I'd write songs that were more classically structured. As it is, I've had to create my own way of writing, which isn't typical. Everything's a big crescendo." For a brief while, Welch and Summers performed as a duo called Florence Robot/Isa Machine in small London venues. Over the coming months, Robert Ackroyd (guitar, backing vocals), Chris Hayden (drums, percussion, backing vocals), Mark Saunders (bass guitar, backing vocals) and Tom Monger (harp) were recruited to form a band, renamed Florence and the Machine. In November 2008, Welch signed a recording contract with Island Records. Prior to recording the album, Welch spent a long time honing her sound while working with guitarists, intent on "[making] it into something that was a wave of sound that would envelop, something that was soaring, slightly church-like and then-doomlike."

The band elected to record a shorter rendition of "Kiss with a Fist" as their debut single. Welch, however, began expanding upon the crude punk style which influenced "Kiss with a Fist" by listening to more contemporary music, particularly Arcade Fire's debut album Funeral (2004). The influence of the recordings would manifest itself on the concept she had devised for Lungs, which, according to Welch, was a "scrapbook of the past five years... it's about guilt, fear, love, death, violence, nightmares, [and] dreams". Ultimately, the majority of Welch's earlier self-penned compositions were rejected for the album—except "Kiss with a Fist" and "Between Two Lungs"—because they did not mesh well with the album's themes. Fortunately for the group, they rehearsed and improvised some of the material in the relaxed setting of Summers' studio, allowing Welch to refine the tribal drumming backdropping Lungss tracks, most notably "Dog Days Are Over".

Florence and the Machine recorded Lungs in the United Kingdom with five different producers—Paul Epworth, James Ford, Stephen Mackey, Eg White, and Charlie Hugall. Most of the songs on the album were mixed by Cenzo Townshend. The album's sound is described as indie rock, indie pop, baroque pop, art rock, art pop, alternative rock and soul with influences of punk blues, electro-rock and garage rock.

Artwork
The imagery of Lungs, featuring a style derived from the Ante-Donatello Brotherhood, was handled by two of Welch's friends: photographer Tom Beard and art director Tabitha Denholm, who are partners at the studio Partizan. Denholm also plays with the band's manager Mairead Nash in the DJ duo Queens of Noize. For the album cover, Denholm created a concept built around a pair of lungs worn visibly on Welch's chest. Welch's personal stylist Aldene Johnson handled the wardrobe, "an Emma Cook chain dress that was in a kind of 1920s style", while Orlando Weeks, an art student and frontman of the band the Maccabees, built the prostethic lungs, which he intended to give "a Victoriana, industrial punchbag kind of look".

Release and promotion

Florence and the Machine announced via their website on 24 September 2010 that Lungs would be re-released on 15 November as a two-disc package titled Between Two Lungs. The reissue features new sleeve art, liner notes by Welch, and a 12-track bonus disc including live versions, remixes, Welch's mashup collaboration with Dizzee Rascal, "You Got the Dirtee Love", and "Heavy in Your Arms", which was released as a single from the soundtrack to The Twilight Saga: Eclipse (2010). The live recordings are taken from the band's performance at the 2010 iTunes Festival, most of which were not previously available on the band's iTunes Festival: London 2010 EP.

On 27 February 2011, Lungs: The B-Sides was released exclusively in the United States to digital music retailers such as the iTunes Store and Amazon MP3. This was followed by the release of a deluxe edition of Lungs in the US on 26 April 2011, featuring all 11 tracks from Lungs: The B-Sides on a bonus disc to accompany the original 13-track album. On 3 July 2019, ten years after the original release of the album, the band announced that a limited "tenth anniversary edition" was available for pre-order. It was released digitally on 16 August, with the LPs and cassettes released the same day. An exclusive box set was released on 4 October. The box set comprises the original LP; a second LP with "three previously unreleased demo tracks, a rare acoustic version of "My Boy Builds Coffins", a cover of the Beatles' "Oh! Darling" Live at Abbey Road, and a number of B sides [and] rarities." It also includes "postcards and inserts, showcasing previously unseen images from the Lungs era" chosen by Welch herself.

Singles
"Kiss with a Fist" was released on 9 June 2008 as the lead single from Lungs, peaking at number 51 on the UK Singles Chart.

"Dog Days Are Over" was released on 1 December 2008 as the album's second single. While the 2010 reissue charted higher, the 2008 release only reached number 89 on the UK Singles Chart. The song was used in the theatrical trailer for the 2010 film Eat Pray Love, starring Julia Roberts. The Yeasayer remix of "Dog Days Are Over", which is included on Between Two Lungs, was released on 12 October 2010 on iTunes.

"Rabbit Heart (Raise It Up)" was released as the third single from the album on 22 June 2009, peaking at number 12 on the UK Singles Chart. "Drumming Song" was released as the album's fourth single on 7 September 2009, reaching number 54 in the UK.

"You've Got the Love" was the fifth single to be released from the album, and reached a new peak of number five on the UK Singles Chart in January 2010. The band had recorded a version of this the Source song which had been a live staple and issued it as a B-side to "Dog Days Are Over", but the success of the previous singles made Island request "You've Got the Love" as a single. Welch went on to record new vocal takes with engineer Cenzo Townshend, replacing the first two verses and the first chorus. Townshend also remixed the bass and drums to be "a bit harder and the bottom end a bit heavier." Florence and the Machine's duet with rapper Dizzee Rascal at the 2010 Brit Awards on 16 February 2010, a mashup of "You've Got the Love" and Dizzee Rascal's "Dirtee Cash" titled "You Got the Dirtee Love", was released on iTunes the day after the ceremony. "You Got the Dirtee Love" reached number two on the UK chart.

On 5 January 2010, "Hurricane Drunk" was originally announced as the sixth single from the album. A video for the song was filmed in Paris on 8 January 2010 and premiered on 29 January after the Celebrity Big Brother 2010 final on Channel 4. However, on 3 March 2010, a reissue of "Dog Days Are Over" was announced through the band's website. The single was released digitally on 11 April and as a seven-inch vinyl the following day, along with a new music video. It reached a new peak of number 23 on the UK Singles Chart.

"Cosmic Love" was released on 5 July 2010 as the album's sixth and final single. The song reached number 51 on the UK Singles Chart. The band made a guest appearance in the 7 February 2011 episode of Gossip Girl, titled "Panic Roommate", where they performed an acoustic rendition of "Cosmic Love".

Critical reception

Lungs received generally positive reviews from music critics. At Metacritic, which assigns a normalised rating out of 100 to reviews from mainstream publications, the album received an average score of 79, based on 22 reviews. James Christopher Monger of AllMusic praised it as "one of the most musically mature and emotionally mesmerizing albums of 2009" and stated, "With an arsenal of weaponry that included the daring musicality of Kate Bush, the fearless delivery of Sinéad O'Connor, and the dark, unhinged vulnerability of Fiona Apple, the London native crafted a debut that not only lived up to the machine-gun spray of buzz that heralded her arrival, but easily surpassed it." Ryan Dombal wrote for Pitchfork that Florence Welch "bursts mouth wide wide over garage rock, epic soul, pint-tipping Britbeat, and—best of all—a mystic brand of pop that's part Annie Lennox, Grace Slick, and Joanna Newsom." Q noted that "there's a lot going on, but Welch never confuses breadth with depth". Entertainment Weeklys Joseph Brannigan Lynch opined that Welch's "immaculately constructed indie pop recalls Regina Spektor, but without the studied artiness: Welch is more concerned with raw emotional release." Spins Melissa Maerz stated, "From the way she sings, in big gulps and Teen Wolf growls, to the mystical art-rock ballads she bedazzles with sleigh bells, harps, and choirs, there's enough drama here for a Broadway musical. But her delivery is so raw that every mess feels genuine."

Rolling Stones Jon Dolan expressed that "[t]he best bits feel like being chased through a moonless night by a sexy moor witch." Slant Magazines Nick Day referred to the band's music as "particularly sensitive to studio gloss" and praised Welch's singing as "a fine balance between elegance and frenzy." In a review for The Guardian, Dave Simpson viewed that Welch "has created a sonic labyrinth of xylophones, percussion, Gregorian chants and werewolves. It can sound affected, occasionally crass, but there's enough adventure to make this worth backing for the Mercury." Jamie Fullerton of NME commended the work of producers James Ford and Paul Epworth, writing that they "create epic cauldron-swirls of Terminator-theme drums, Massive Attack atmospherics and twinkle-eye harp matched by Florence's grappling of skyward choruses", but found that "with the likes of 'I'm Not Calling You A Liar' and 'Howl' boasting similarly windy production yet no identifiable tunes the results sound aimless—if harmless." Genevieve Koski of The A.V. Club felt that "[a]t times, Lungs borders on exhausting, careening as it does from one over-the-top track to the next. [...] But with a voice as strong and emotive as hers, it's not surprising that Welch has little use for moments of quiet contemplation." Despite criticising instances of "over-smoothed" production on certain tracks, The Observers Sheryl Garratt concluded that "there's a real joy about this debut. It's the sound of someone who has found their voice and is keen to use it – as loudly and freely as possible."

Accolades
Lungs was shortlisted for the 2009 Mercury Prize. The following year, the album won the MasterCard British Album award at the Brit Awards.

Commercial performance
Lungs debuted at number two on the UK Albums Chart (behind Michael Jackson's 2005 compilation album The Essential Michael Jackson), selling 63,020 copies in its first week—the second highest amount for a debut album in 2009, after Susan Boyle's I Dreamed a Dream. On 17 January 2010, after spending 28 consecutive weeks in the top 40, the album topped the UK chart for the first time, selling 51,005 copies. It spent a second consecutive week atop the chart, with 42,359 copies sold. On 8 March 2019, Lungs was certified sextuple platinum by the British Phonographic Industry (BPI), and had sold 1,813,557 copies in the United Kingdom by August 2019.

Following the band's performance of "Dog Days Are Over" at the 2010 MTV Video Music Awards, Lungs jumped from number 44 to number 14 on the US Billboard 200 with sales of 21,000 copies, an increase of 165% from the previous week. The album was certified double platinum by the Recording Industry Association of America (RIAA) on 25 June 2018. It had sold 1,142,000 copies in the United States as of February 2013. Worldwide, Lungs had sold over three million copies as of November 2011.

Track listing

Notes
  signifies an additional producer
  signifies a vocal producer
  signifies a remixer
  signifies a mixer

Personnel
Credits adapted from the liner notes of Lungs.

Florence and the Machine
 Florence Welch – vocals, additional drumming, percussion ; background vocals 
 Christopher Lloyd Hayden – drums 
 Isabella Summers – additional drumming, percussion ; piano 
 Rob Ackroyd – guitar ; bass guitar 
 Tom Monger – harp

Additional musicians

 LaDonna Harley-Peters – background vocals 
 Victoria Akintola – background vocals 
 Martin Slattery – drums 
 James Ford – drums ; bass guitar ; additional piano ; organ 
 Charlie Hugall – additional drumming, percussion ; additional bass 
 Tim McCall – guitar ; additional guitar 
 Leo Abrahams – guitar 
 Stephen Mackey – bass guitar 
 Mete Burch Bator – bass guitar 
 Sally Herbert – string arrangements, violin
 Everton Nelson – violin
 Bruce White – viola
 Ian Burdge – cello 
 Charlie Henry – cello 
 Duncan "Pixie" Mills – Hammond organ

Technical

 James Ford – production ; mixing 
 Jimmy Robertson – recording ; mixing 
 Paul Epworth – production ; additional production 
 Mark Rankin – recording ; additional recording 
 Isabella Summers – additional production 
 Stephen Mackey – production ; vocal production ; mixing 
 Richard Flack – recording ; vocal production ; mixing 
 Charlie Hugall – production 
 Duncan "Pixie" Mills – engineering assistance 
 Ben Jackson – engineering assistance 
 Al Riley – engineering assistance 
 Eg White – production 
 Cenzo Townshend – mixing 
 Neil Comber – mixing assistance 
 Ben Mortimer – final edit 
 John Davis – mastering

Artwork

 Tabitha Denholm – art direction
 Florence Welch – art direction
 Tom Beard – photography
 Wade Fletcher – live photograph
 Orlando Weeks – lung illustration
 Hugh Frost – layout

Charts

Weekly charts

Year-end charts

Decade-end charts

All-time charts

Certifications and sales

Release history

Notes

References

Bibliography

External links

2009 debut albums
Albums produced by James Ford (musician)
Albums produced by Paul Epworth
Brit Award for British Album of the Year
Florence and the Machine albums
Island Records albums
Universal Republic Records albums
Electronic rock albums by English artists
Soul albums by English artists
Punk blues albums
Garage rock albums by English artists